Crociati Noceto S.S.D. (formerly known as Crociati Parma) was an Italian association football club located in Noceto, Emilia-Romagna.

History

The foundation 

In the 2006–07 season, the former Crociati Parma has played in Girone A of Eccellenza Emilia-Romagna, where it placed first, winning direct promotion to Serie D. In summer 2007 the team has absorbed A.C.Noceto and it has changed its name in Crociati Noceto.

From Serie D to Lega Pro Seconda Divisione 
In the Serie D 2007–08 season, was ranked at 10th place in Girone D. However, a year later, in the Serie D 2008–09 season, the team won the same division, obtaining so the direct promotion to Lega Pro Seconda Divisione.

The season 2011–12 in Eccellenza 
The club didn't join 2011–12 league in Lega Pro Seconda Divisione and it was relegated to Eccellenza Emilia–Romagna group A.

In 2016 the club folded.

Colors and badge 
Its colors are blue and yellow.

References

External links 
  

Football clubs in Italy
Football clubs in Emilia-Romagna
Association football clubs established in 1992
Association football clubs disestablished in 2016
Serie C clubs
Companies based in the Province of Parma